Laboratory Investigation is a peer-reviewed medical journal of pathology published by the Nature Publishing Group. It is the official journal of the United States and Canadian Academy of Pathology. The journal is published monthly, with one supplemental issue per year.

According to the Journal Citation Reports, Laboratory Investigation has a 2020 impact factor of 5.662, ranking it 11th out of 77 in the category Pathology.

Pathobiology in Focus is a special publication established in 2006, published in parallel with Laboratory Investigation. It publishes select articles deemed to have higher profiles.

Abstracting and indexing
Laboratory Investigation is abstracted and indexed in the following databases
Index Medicus
Current Contents/Life Sciences
 Science Citation Index
Excerpta Medica

References

External links
Laboratory Investigation website
United States and Canadian Academy of Pathology website

Pathology journals
Nature Research academic journals
Monthly journals
English-language journals
Academic journals associated with learned and professional societies